Darkuman is a town in the Accra Metropolitan district, a district of the Greater Accra Region of Ghana.

References

Populated places in the Greater Accra Region